Alexander Aleksandrovich Volchkov (born September 25, 1977) is a Russian former professional ice hockey player.

Early life 
Volchkov was born in Moscow. As a youth, he played in the 1991 Quebec International Pee-Wee Hockey Tournament with a team from Moscow.

Career 
He was the Washington Capitals' first round draft pick at the 1996 NHL Entry Draft, picked fourth overall. He played three NHL games  during his whole career, in the 1999–2000 season.

Career statistics

Regular season and playoffs

International statistics

References

External links

1977 births
Living people
Barrie Colts players
Beibarys Atyrau players
Cincinnati Cyclones (IHL) players
Hamilton Bulldogs (AHL) players
HC CSKA Moscow players
HC Sibir Novosibirsk players
HC Vityaz players
Ice hockey people from Moscow
Kapitan Stupino players
Keramin Minsk players
Krylya Sovetov Moscow players
HK Mogilev players
Molot-Prikamye Perm players
National Hockey League first-round draft picks
HK Neman Grodno players
Portland Pirates players
Russian ice hockey left wingers
Torpedo Nizhny Novgorod players
Washington Capitals draft picks
Washington Capitals players
Yertis Pavlodar players
Yunost Minsk players